George Hayes may refer to:

 Sir George Hayes (judge) (1805–1869), British jurist
 George "Gabby" Hayes (1885–1969), American actor
 George Hayes (British actor) (1888–1967), British stage and film actor
 George Hayes (ice hockey) (1914–1987), Canadian NHL linesman
 George W. Hayes (1847–1933), former slave and politician in Ohio
 George Edward Chalmer Hayes (1894–1968), American civil rights lawyer and public official
 George Hayes (footballer) (1908–1984), Welsh footballer

See also
George Hays (disambiguation)
George Hay (disambiguation)